Barrett is a surname of Irish origin. It is derived from the Gaelic Bairéid. Popular in both south-east and south-west Ireland, it is most common in the Irish counties of Mayo and Galway but particularly County Cork. The Barretts of Ireland first appeared following the Norman invasion. As with many other Anglo-Norman families, they were quickly assimilated into Irish culture.  
Another translation for Barrett is "warlike people".

People with the surname Barrett are largely found in the United States, United Kingdom, Ireland, Canada, Australia, New Zealand, South Africa, Jamaica, and Denmark.

Notable people
 A. Igoni Barrett (born 1979), Nigerian author
 Aaron Barrett (born 1974), lead singer of American ska punk band Reel Big Fish
 Alex Barrett (born 1994), American football player
 Alexander Barrett (1866–1954), English cricketer
 Alice Barrett (born 1956), American actress
 Amanda Barrett, vocalist and multi-instrumentalist for The Ditty Bops
 Amy Coney Barrett (born 1972), Associate Justice of the U.S. Supreme Court 
 Andre Barrett (born 1982), American basketball player
 Andrea Barrett (born 1954), American novelist
 Arthur Barrett (cricketer) (1944–2018), West Indian cricketer
 Aston "Family Man" Barrett (born 1946), Jamaican musician
 Barbara Barrett (born 1950), 25th U.S. Secretary of the Air Force and former U.S. Ambassador to Finland
 Baz Barrett, bass guitarist for Consumed and Crippled Black Phoenix
 Beauden Barrett (born 1991), New Zealand rugby union player
 Becky Barrett (born 1942), Canadian politician
 Bill Barrett (1929–2016), Nebraska politician
 Bob Barrett (American football) (born 1935), American football player
 Bob Barrett (baseball) (born 1899), American baseball infielder
 Brendon Ryan Barrett (born 1986), American actor
 Ciarán Bairéad (1905–1976), Irish scholar
 Carlton Barrett (born 1950), Jamaican musician
 Chad Barrett, American professional soccer player
 Charles D. Barrett (born 1885), Major General in the United States Marine Corps
 Charles Golding Barrett (1836–1904), English lepidopterist
 Charles Leslie Barrett (born 1870), Australian natural history writer
 Charley Barrett (born 1893), American football player in College Football Hall of Fame
 Coleman Barrett (born 1982), Irish boxer
 Colin Barrett (born 1952), English footballer
 Colleen Barrett (born 1944), President of Southwest Airlines
 Craig Barrett (disambiguation)
 Craig Barrett (chief executive) (born 1939), former Chairman and CEO of Intel Corporation
 Daniel Barrett (disambiguation)
 David Barrett (disambiguation)
 Dicky Barrett (born 1964), lead singer of The Mighty Mighty Bosstones, and announcer of the late-night TV talk show Jimmy Kimmel Live!
 Deirdre Barrett, author and psychologist who teaches at Harvard Medical School
 Duncan Barrett (born 1983), English author
 Eaton Stannard Barrett (born 1786), Irish author and poet
  Edith Helen Barrett (1872–1939), Australian medical doctor
 Edward Barrett (Irish sportsman) (1877–1932), Irish Olympic athlete
 Edward Barrett (Medal of Honor) (born 1855), American second class fireman
 Elizabeth Barrett Browning (born 1806), English poet
 Ellen Barrett (born 1946), American priest
 Emmett Barrett (1916–2005), American football player
 Eugene Barrett (1931–2003), American serial killer
 Francis Barrett (disambiguation), includes Frank Barrett
 Fred Barrett (disambiguation)
 Gabby Barrett (born 2002), American singer and 2018 runner-up of American Idol TV talent competition
 George Barret Sr. (born c. 1730) Irish landscape painter
 George Barret Jr. (born 1767), English landscape painter, son of George Barret Sr.
 George Barrett (actuary) (born 1752), English actuary
 George Barrett (jockey) (born 1863), English jockey
 George F. Barrett (born 1907), Illinois Attorney General
 George S. Barrett, American health business executive
 George W. Barrett (born c. 1881), a murderer called Diamond King
 Gerard Barrett (runner) (born 1956), Australian Olympic runner
 Gerard Barrett (director), Irish film director
 Giles Leonard Barrett (c. 1744–1809), English and American actor
 Grace Barrett (1897–1979), birth name of American actress Gretchen Hartman
 Graham Barrett (born 1981), Irish professional footballer
 H. Gordon Barrett, Canadian politician
 J. Gresham Barrett (born 1961), U.S. congressman
 Jacinda Barrett (born 1972), Australian actress
 Jack Barrett (disambiguation)
 Jake Barrett (born 1991), American baseball pitcher
 James Barrett (disambiguation), includes Jim and Jimmy Barrett (disambiguation)
 Jeffrey A. Barrett (born 1964), American philosopher
 Joe Barrett (born 1902), Gaelic footballer
 John Barrett (disambiguation)
 Jordie Barrett (born 1997), New Zealand rugby union player
 J. T. Barrett (born 1995), American football player
 Justin Barrett (born 1971), Irish politician
 Justin L. Barrett, psychologist
 Kane Barrett (born 1990), New Zealand rugby union player
 Kate Waller Barrett (1857–1925), American physician and social reformer
 Lawrence Barrett (born 1838), American actor
 Lee and Oli Barrett, British social media personalities based in China
 Leonard E. Barrett (1920–2007), Jamaican academic 
 Lindsay Barrett (born 1941), Jamaican-Nigerian author
 Linton Lomas Barrett (born 1904), Ph.D., diplomat and translator
 Lorraine Barrett (born 1950), Welsh politician
 Lucas Barrett (born 1837), English geologist
 Lynne Barrett, American author
 Mario (singer) (Mario Barrett, born 1986), singer/actor/dancer
 Majel Barrett (1932–2008), American actress
 Malcolm Barrett (actor) (born 1980), American actor
 Marcia Barrett (born 1945), singer in Boney M.
 Marty Barrett (second baseman) (born 1958), American baseball player
 Mathias Barrett (1900–1990), Irish monk
 Michael B. Barrett, Brigadier General, USAR, former Professor of History at The Citadel
 Monte Barrett (born 1971), professional boxer
 Nancy Barrett (born 1943), American actress
 Nathan Barrett (disambiguation)
 Nathaniel Barrett (1861–1933), American physician and politician
 Neal Barrett Jr. (1929–2014), American writer
 Neil Barrett (disambiguation)
 Norman Barrett, Australian-born British surgeon who first described Barrett's oesophagus in 1957
 Otis Barrett (1872–1950), American agriculturalist
 Pam Barrett, Canadian politician
 Pat Barrett (wrestler) (born 1941), Irish professional wrestler
 Pat Barrett (boxer) (born 1967), British boxer
 Patrick Barrett (d. 1415), 15th century Irish bishop
 Paul Barrett (born 1940), Welsh music manager and producer
 Peter Barrett (bishop) (1956–2015), Church of Ireland bishop
 Rachel Barrett (1874–1953), British editor and suffragette 
 Rafael Barrett (1876–1910), Spanish journalist and political activist who relocated to Paraguay
 Ray Barrett (1927–2009), Australian actor
 Red Barrett (1915–1990), retired MLB pitcher
 Richard Barrett (disambiguation) 
 RJ Barrett (born 2000), Canadian basketball player
 Robbie Barrett (born 1992), British boxer
 Robert G. Barrett, Australian author
 Ron Barrett, illustrator, author and puzzle maker
 Rona Barrett (born 1936), American gossip columnist not born as or married to a Barrett
 Ronnie Barrett (born 1954), founder of Barrett Firearms Manufacturing
 Rowan Barrett (born 1972), Canadian basketball player and executive
 Ryan Barrett (1982), English boxer
 Scott Barrett (rugby union) (born 1993), New Zealand rugby union player
 Sidney F. Barrett (1892–1958), philatelist of New York City
 Slim Barrett (born 1960s), Irish jewellery designer and artist
 Stanton Barrett (born 1972), American stuntman and racing driver
 Syd Barrett (1946–2006), real name Roger Barrett, early Pink Floyd frontman
 Sylvester Barrett (born 1926), Irish politician
 Ted Barrett (born 1965), MLB umpire
 Theobald Butler Barrett, Canadian politician
 Thomas Barrett (disambiguation), various people of that name
 Tina Barrett (born 1976), former member of pop group S Club 7
 Trent Barrett (born 1977), Australian Rugby League player
 Veronica Grace Boland, née Barrett (1899–1982), first female member of Congress from Pennsylvania
 Wade Barrett, the best-known ring persona of English professional wrestler Stu Bennett (born 1980)
 Wade Barrett (soccer) (born 1976), American soccer player
 Warren Barrett (born 1970), Jamaican professional footballer
 Wayne Barrett (1945–2017), journalist for the Village Voice
 William Spencer Barrett (W. S. Barrett) (1914–2001), English classical scholar known for his commentary on Euripides' Hippolytus
 Willie Barrett, Irish hurling referee
 Wild Willy Barrett (born 1950), musician
 Wilson Barrett (1846–1904), English actor
 Zelfa Barrett (born 1993) British boxer

References

English-language surnames